NXP Semiconductors N.V. (NXP) is a Dutch semiconductor designer and manufacturer with headquarters in Eindhoven, Netherlands. The company employs approximately 31,000 people in more than 30 countries. NXP reported revenue of $11.06 billion in 2021.

Originally spun off from Philips in 2006, NXP completed its initial public offering, on August 6, 2010, with shares trading on NASDAQ under the ticker symbol NXPI. On December 23, 2013, NXP Semiconductors was added to the Nasdaq-100 index. On March 2, 2015, it was announced that NXP would merge with Freescale Semiconductor. The merger was closed on December 7, 2015. On October 27, 2016, it was announced that Qualcomm would try to buy NXP. Because the Chinese merger authority did not approve the acquisition before the deadline set by Qualcomm, the attempt was effectively cancelled on July 26, 2018.

Description
NXP provides technology solutions targeting the automotive, industrial & IoT, mobile, and communication infrastructure markets. The company owns over 9,500 patent families.

NXP is the co-inventor of near field communication (NFC) technology along with Sony and Inside Secure and supplies NFC chip sets that enable mobile phones to be used to pay for goods, and store and exchange data securely. NXP manufactures chips for eGovernment applications such as electronic passports; RFID tags and labels; and transport and access management, with the chip set and contactless card for MIFARE used by many major public transit systems worldwide. In order to protect against potential hackers, NXP offers gateways to automotive manufacturers that prevent communication with every network within a car independently.

Worldwide sites

NXP Semiconductors is headquartered in Eindhoven, Netherlands. The company has operations in more than 30 countries.

Wafer fabs 
Chandler, Arizona, United States
Austin, Texas, United States
Nijmegen, Netherlands
Singapore (SSMC)

Test and assembly 
Bangkok, Thailand
Kaohsiung, Taiwan
Petaling Jaya, Malaysia
Tianjin, China

Joint ventures 
Systems on Silicon Manufacturing Company (SSMC) Pte. Ltd. (61%)
Datang NXP Semiconductors Co., Ltd. (49%)
Advanced Semiconductor Manufacturing Co. Ltd. (27%)
Cohda Wireless Pty Ltd. (23%)

History

Within Philips
In 1953 Philips started a small scale production facility in the center of the Dutch city Nijmegen as part of its main industry group "Icoma" (Industrial Components and Materials), followed by the opening of a new factory in 1955. In 1965 Icoma became part of a new Philips main industry group: "Elcoma" (Electronic Components and Materials). In 1975 Silicon Valley–based Signetics was acquired by Philips. Signetics claimed to be the "first company in the world established expressly to make and sell integrated circuits" and inventor of the 555 timer IC. At the time, it was claimed that with the Signetics acquisition, Philips was now number two in the league table of semiconductor manufacturers in the world. In 1987, Philips was ranked Europe's largest semiconductor maker. The year after, all Philips semiconductor subsidiaries, including Signetics, Faselec (in Switzerland) and Mullard (in the UK), were merged in the newly formed product division Components. The semiconductor activities were split off from Components in 1991 under the name Philips Semiconductors. In June 1999, Philips acquired VLSI Technology, at the time making Philips the world's sixth largest semiconductor company.

Independent company
In December 2005, Philips announced its intention to divest Philips Semiconductors into an independent legal entity. In September 2006, Philips completed the sale of an 80.1% stake in Philips Semiconductors to a consortium of private equity investors consisting of Kohlberg Kravis Roberts (KKR), Bain Capital, Silver Lake Partners, Apax Partners, and AlpInvest Partners. The new company name NXP (from Next eXPerience) was announced on August 31, 2006, and the company was officially launched during the Internationale Funkausstellung (IFA) consumer electronics show in Berlin. The newly independent NXP was ranked as one of the world's top 10 semiconductor companies.

In February 2007, when NXP announced that it would acquire Silicon Laboratories’ AeroFONE single-chip phone and power amplifier product lines to strengthen its Mobile and Personal business. The next year, NXP announced that it would transform its Mobile and Personal business unit into a joint venture with STMicroelectronics, which in 2009 became ST-Ericsson, a 50/50 joint venture of Ericsson Mobile Platforms and STMicroelectronics, after ST purchased NXP's 20% stake. In April 2008, NXP announced it would acquire the set-top box business of Conexant to complement its existing Home business unit. In September 2008, NXP announced that it would restructure its manufacturing, R&D and back office operations, resulting in 4,500 job cuts worldwide. In October 2009, NXP announced that it would sell its Home business unit to Trident Microsystems. 

Before the divestiture of Nexperia in June 2016, NXP was a volume supplier of discrete and standard logic devices, celebrating its 50 years in logic (via its history as both Signetics and Philips Semiconductors) in March 2012.

NXP's first CEO was Frans van Houten; he was succeeded by Richard L. Clemmer on January 1, 2009. Since May 2020, Kurt Sievers serves as President and CEO.

Freescale acquisition
In March 2015, a merger agreement was announced through which NXP would acquire rival Freescale Semiconductor. In view of this merger, NXP's RF Power activities were sold to JAC Capital for US$1.8 billion and rebranded as Ampleon, in a transaction closed in November 2015. Both NXP and Freescale had deep roots stretching back to when they were part of Philips (NXP), and Motorola (Freescale). Each had comparable revenue figures; US$4.8 billion and US$4.2 billion in 2013 for NXP and Freescale, respectively with NXP primarily focusing on near field communication (NFC) and high-performance mixed signal (HPMS) hardware, and Freescale focusing on its microprocessor and microcontroller businesses, and both companies possessing roughly equal patent portfolios. On December 7, 2015, NXP completed its acquisition of Freescale Semiconductor; the merged company continued its operation as NXP Semiconductors N.V..

Notable events
 On July 26, 2010, NXP announced that it had acquired Jennic based in Sheffield, UK, which now operates as part of its smart home and energy product line, using Zigbee and JenNet-IP.
 On August 6, 2010, NXP announced its initial public offering at NASDAQ, with 34,000,000 shares, pricing each $14.
 In December 2010, NXP announced that it would sell its Sound Solutions business to Knowles Electronics, part of Dover Corporation, for $855 million in cash. The acquisition was completed as of July 5, 2011.
 In April 2012, NXP announced its intent to acquire electronic design consultancy Catena to work on automotive applications.
 In July 2012, NXP sold its high-speed data converter assets to Integrated Device Technology.
 In 2012, revenue for NXP's Identification business unit was $986 million, up 41% from 2011, in part due to growing sales of NFC chips and secure elements.
 On January 4, 2013, NXP and Cisco announced their investment in Cohda Wireless, an Australian company focused on car-to-car and car-to-infrastructure communications.
 In January 2013, NXP announced 700-900 redundancies worldwide in an effort to cut costs related to "support services".
 In May 2013, NXP announced that it acquired Code Red Technologies, a provider of embedded software development such as the LPCXpresso IDE and Red Suite.
 In July 2014, NXP was reported to have sacked union organizers.  A campaign was started for their reinstatement.
 In August 2015, a joint-venture with the Beijing JianGuang Asset Management Co. Ltd. was registered in Shanghai, China under the name WeEn Semiconductors.
 On June 14, 2016, it was announced that Nexperia would be divested from NXP to a consortium of financial investors consisting of Beijing Jianguang Asset Management Co., Ltd (“JAC Capital”) and Wise Road Capital LTD (“Wise Road Capital”). WeEn Semiconductors started delivery of bipolar and SiC power semiconductors, TRIACs, IGBT modules, etc. 
In April 2017, Qualcomm received approval from U.S. antitrust regulators for the acquisition of NXP for $47 billion. However, the acquisition has not received approval from Chinese authorities and Qualcomm has refiled an antitrust application and request to purchase with the PRC Ministry of Commerce.
 In September 2018, NXP announced that it acquired OmniPHY, a provider of automotive Ethernet subsystem technology.
On December 6, 2019, NXP announced the completion of the acquisition of the wireless connectivity assets from Marvell.
On May 27, 2020, NXP announced that at its Annual General Meeting of Shareholders (“AGM”) that shareholders overwhelmingly approved the appointment of Kurt Sievers as an executive director and the company’s chief executive officer effective immediately thereby replacing Richard Clemmer, who previously led the company for 11 years. In this capacity Mr. Sievers will also remain President of NXP, a role he has held since 2018.
On June 18, 2020, NXP announced HoverGames Challenge 2: Help Drones Help Others
On July 21, 2020, NXP delivered secure and scalable edge-connected platforms based on its i.MX RT crossover processors and Wi-Fi/Bluetooth solutions
On August 11, 2020, NXP’s industry-first solution to combine UWB fine-ranging, NFC, Secure Element, and embedded SIM (eSIM) was included in Samsung’s new Galaxy Note20 Ultra

Controversies
In March 2013, NXP locked out workers at its plant in Bangkok, Thailand. The reason was stalled negotiations over a new work schedule with their trade union, which was affiliated with the Confederation of Thai Electrical Appliances, Electronic Automobile & Metalworkers (TEAM). Management then called in small groups of workers, asked them if they agreed with the union's demands, and told them to leave if they did. They were not able to enter the factory the next day. In response, TEAM staged protests outside the factory and on March 13 outside the Dutch embassy and also filed a complaint with the National Human Right Commission. On April 29, mediation by the Ministry of Labour led to the signing of a memorandum that passed the decision over the work schedule to the Labour Relations Committee. The committee decided on June 20 that the new work schedule did not violate Thai labour law; however, the National Human Rights Committee decided otherwise and recommended the factory should revert to the old schedule. NXP continues to demand regular 12-hour shifts.

In May 2014, the company fired 24 workers at its plant in the special economic zone  in Cabuyao, The Philippines. The workers were all officials of a trade union affiliated with the Metal Workers Alliance of the Philippines (MWAP). Reports said they were fired due to their union functions in negotiations for a new collective bargaining agreement. Factory owners claimed the workers were fired after refusing to work on April 9, while workers said they had not been paid for two months. IndustriALL and its affiliated unions in the Philippines condemned the dismissals. In September, MWAP and NXP reached an agreement by which 12 of the fired workers were reinstated and the other 12 received separation packages. NXP also committed itself to a long-term wage increase. In the summer of 2015, a member of the Dutch parliament questioned trade minister Lilianne Ploumen regarding NXP's behaviour.

See also
 NXP MIFARE contactless smart cards and proximity cards
 NXP LPC microcontrollers
 NXP QorIQ microprocessors
 NXP GreenChip

References

External links 

 
Semiconductor companies of the Netherlands
Radio-frequency identification companies
Multinational companies headquartered in the Netherlands
Companies based in Eindhoven
Electronics companies established in 1953
2006 mergers and acquisitions
Private equity portfolio companies
2010 initial public offerings
Apax Partners companies
Bain Capital companies
Kohlberg Kravis Roberts companies
Philips
Silver Lake (investment firm) companies
Companies listed on the Nasdaq
Dutch brands
Corporate spin-offs
Dutch companies established in 1953